The Communist Ghadar Party of India is a far-left political party that is committed to a communist revolution in India based on Marxism–Leninism.

History
The party was founded on 25 December 1980, as a continuation of the Hindustani Ghadar Party – Organisation of Indian Marxist–Leninists Abroad founded in Canada in 1970. The group had established a presence in Punjab during the 1970s. Initially the group identified itself with the Naxalite movement in India, especially in Punjab. However, by the end of the 1970s the group rejected the Three Worlds Theory and sided with Albania in the Sino-Albanian split. The name of the party was inspired by the American-based Ghadar Party, formed by Indian revolutionaries in the early 1900s. Ghadar means revolt, a narrative abbreviation referring to Indian Revolt.

The party opposed the policies of the Communist Party of India (CPI) and the Communist Party of India (Marxist) (CPI(M)) at the time, which according to CGPI had both adopted a policy of parliamentarianism and support for the Soviet Union and the Naxalbari were fragmented. The party also adopted a policy of opposing 'national oppression', particularly in Punjab, Kashmir and Manipur and rejected defense of the centralised India state.

In December 1990 they held their first congress where they reflected upon the collapse of the Soviet Union, declaring "we are our own models". They concluded that "it is the workers and peasants, women and youth, organised in their collectives, who should rule". They recognised the communist movement as one, and rejected social-democracy as a compromise between right reaction and revolution and rejecting support for the Indian National Congress party against the Bharatiya Janata Party (BJP).

The Second Congress was held in 1999, and the Third Congress in January 2005. At the latter the Constitution of the Communist Ghadar Party of India was adopted. The Fourth Congress was held in October 2010. 25 December 2010 marked the 30th anniversary of the founding the Party.

Ideology and theory
The work of CGPI is based on the theoretical thinking of Marxism–Leninism and guided by contemporary Marxist–Leninist thought. Contemporary Marxist–Leninist thought is the summation, taken in general form, of the experience of the application of Marxism–Leninism to the conditions of socialist revolution and socialist construction, to the struggle against modern revisionism and against capitalist restoration, against fascism, militarism, imperialism and medievalism. It is not the final form of Marxism–Leninism under the economy, empowerment of the people and the democratic renewal of India.

The principle adopted at the First Congress that "we are our own models", let us emulate the best we have created.

"We are her masters!" — the Program adopted by the Second Congress of the Communist Ghadar Party of India in October 1998 was characterised by the slogan: "Hum hain Iske Malik! Hum hain Hindostan! Mazdoor, Kisan, Aurat aur Jawan!" — which means: "Workers, peasants, women and youth — We constitute India! We are her masters!"

From its 3rd congress document it states: The challenge is to enable the working class to emerge as a united force that forges a powerful front with the peasants and all the oppressed. The challenge is to organise and lead this front to wrest political power from the hands of the exploiting minority and vest it in the hands of the people. The workers, peasants, women and youth of all the nations, nationalities and tribal peoples constituting India must be enabled and organised to set the agenda for the new society. Titled: Towards the Rule of Workers and Peasants and a Voluntary Indian Union.

"Towards the Rule of Workers and Peasants and a Voluntary Indian Union"
In its research, CGPI states in its 3rd congress document:- India is seeking a place at the privileged high table, to carve up the world. The Indian big bourgeoisie, in pursuit of imperialist aims, is seeking closer collaboration with US imperialism as well as with the European Union and Russia. China is seen as a major competitor, while it could also be a potential collaborator. The Indian bourgeoisie is colluding and contending with other imperialist powers, seeking to expand its own sphere of influence in the world, especially in central and South-East Asia. Imperialism, the highest stage of capitalism, stands increasingly exposed as a system that cannot prolong its life without raining death and destruction on a colossal scale. It is being exposed as a system that is unable to sustain itself without militarisation and wars of conquest, without intensifying the degree of exploitation and misery of the labouring people, and without destroying entire nations and continents. Capitalist globalisation—through liberalisation, privatisation and fiscal stabilisation—has been exposed as nothing but unbridled robbery and plunder of the nations and peoples of the world in the interests of monopolies and financial oligarchs of a few big and emerging powers.

"Within the capitalist democracies, the regimes in power are openly showing their contempt for the well-being and rights of the working class and peoples. They are openly revealing themselves as the tools of finance capital and of the biggest and most aggressive capitalist monopolies. The political process of bourgeois democracy, in its parliamentary and presidential forms, stands exposed as a process designed to concentrate political power in fewer and fewer hands, to the exclusion of the vast majority of people. More and more people are protesting this exclusion from power. They are protesting the fact that they have no say, except to vote once in a few years to legitimise the rule of one or another party or coalition of the bourgeoisie.
"The times are calling on all Indian communists to redouble their efforts to forge the political unity of the working class, peasantry, intelligentsia, oppressed nations and nationalities, tribal peoples, dalits, women and youth. Such political unity can and must be forged on the basis of uncompromising opposition to the bourgeoisie and its anti-social program; and for the realisation of the program for the Navnirman of India. This is a program for taking India out of the world imperialist system by making a clean break with the colonial legacy in economic and political terms. It is a program to establish the rule of workers and peasants, and a voluntary Indian Union, with the economy being oriented to fulfil the needs of the toilers and tillers. The Communist Ghadar Party of India, as a contingent of the international communist movement, is dedicated to adopt tactics that will pave the way for the defeat of the bourgeoisie and those who conciliate with it, and ensure the victory of the program for the Navnirman of India."

On developing theory
It pointed out the necessity for the working class to contest outmoded Eurocentric ideas as well as the reactionary bourgeois rendering of Indian thought, so as to develop the theory of the Indian revolution. It also pointed out that the seeds of revolution exist within the existing conditions of perpetual crisis and revolutionary theory must illuminate the way to nourish those seeds so as to open the path to revolution and social progress. The starting point of all theoretical work is the study of the facts and phenomena that are being revealed. Revolutionary theory must assist in analysing the class struggle within the present conditions.

 ... aimed at exposing and defeating the lies, illusions and diversions that the bourgeoisie is throwing at the working class and other discontented masses of people. It must be waged against the enemy within the communist movement—that is, those who are acting as the channels of spreading bourgeois illusions among the workers and peasants.
 ... against the notion that some individual genius or expert group can develop theory and lead the ideological struggle. The struggle against this 'expert line' has been waged concretely by involving more and more comrades in the theoretical and ideological work. The Central Committee has made a conscious effort to create an enabling environment for wider and wider participation in this work. This has greatly contributed to the strengthening of the work of developing theory. In addition to enriching the line, this work has assisted in raising the ideo-political level of all members of the time-tested.
 ... have brought together a large number of comrades to spend extended periods of time on concentrated research work and theoretical treatment of selected topics.
 ... approach to the theoretical and ideological work, as in the case of all other time-tested work, has been to rely on the principle of collective leadership and individual responsibility.
 ... waged a stern struggle in the course of carrying out the theoretical and ideological work, in defence of the scientific method and implementation of agreed upon decisions of the collective. The scientific method consists in starting from facts and analysing the problem as it presents itself today, based on studying the documents of the Party and the Marxist–Leninist classics. A constant struggle has been waged against the tendency to start writing without studying the facts or the Party's basic documents and the classics.
 ... adopted the immediate program of Navnirman (reconstruction, to build afresh, a thoroughgoing renewal), aimed at making the toilers and tillers the masters of India.
 ... have further laid bare the laws of capitalism as they operate at the present stage of monopoly capitalism and imperialism. We have investigated and exposed the content of the privatisation and liberalisation program and the so-called war against terrorism. We have further elaborated the theoretical considerations underlying the Program we have adopted. All this work has contributed to developing the content of the struggle of the working class against this anti-social program. It has contributed to the development of the programmatic calls of mass organisations of the peasantry, of the youth and of all the oppressed.

Further areas include:
 In struggle against the anti-social offensive
 United struggle of the working class
 Worker-peasant alliance
 Against imperialist war, state terrorism and communal violence
 Building organisations to empower the broad masses of people
 Work among the youth
 Work towards the Restoration of Unity of all Communists

Publications
 Mazdoor Ekta Lehar (MEL) (formerly known as People's Voice in its English version) is the organ of the Central Committee of the Communist Ghadar Party of India (CGPI). MEL is both a news-paper and internet newsletter, which serves as the print vehicle and electronic transmission for the dissemination of information to arm the active vanguard force of Indian communists, activists, journalists and other interested parties.

The party publishes Mazdoor Ekta Lehar in:
 English (formerly People's Voice)
 Hindi
 Punjabi
 Tamil

Other publications include:
 What kind of party? (1993)
 Whither India (1996)
 Breaking the Barriers to Unity
 2nd Congress: Program of the Party (1998)
 2nd Congress: Preparing for coming storms (1999)
 Renewal of India, Call of the New Century (1999)
 Only Communism Can Save India! (2001)
 Crisis of Capitalism and the dangerous course of the Indian State points to the urgency for communists to prepare for the proletarian revolution! (2002)
 3rd Congress: Towards the Rule of Workers and Peasants and a Voluntary Indian Union (2005)

See also
 Communist Party of India (Maoist)
 Communist Party of the Philippines
 Shining Path

References

External links
 
  Twenty fifth anniversary of the Communist Ghadar Party of India

Political parties established in 1980
Communist parties in India